Over the history of the House of Commons, the number of Members of Parliament (MPs) has varied for assorted reasons, with increases in recent years due to increases in the population of the United Kingdom. There are currently 650 constituencies, each sending one MP to the House of Commons, corresponding to approximately one for every 92,000 people, or one for every 68,000 parliamentary electors.

While the Conservative – Liberal Democrat coalition governing after the 2010 general election had initially planned to reduce the number of MPs and constituencies to 600 during its term of office, Parliament voted in January 2013 to delay the boundary review this change would require. Section 6 of the Electoral Registration and Administration Act 2013 required that the next review report come by October 2018; that was done, but the delays continued. The overall measure was not implemented and later abrogated with the Parliamentary Constituencies Act 2020, from which the redrawn boundaries will be based and implemented ahead of the next general election in 2024 as scheduled. The new boundary reviews are to be submitted before July 2023.

History 
In the 16th century there were around 310 members of parliament, including representation at various points from Calais and Wales.

In 1654 the First Protectorate Parliament included elected representation from Scotland and Ireland. After the Third Protectorate Parliament in 1659 the Scottish and Irish members disappeared from Westminster until the unions of 1707 and 1801 respectively.

In 1654 England and Wales saw its first systematic redistribution of parliamentary seats ever. However, in 1659 the representation of England and Wales reverted to the pre-Civil War pattern. When the Rump Parliament was recalled, later the same year, and the full Long Parliament was reinstated the following year its composition was exactly the same as before the Protectorate.

Only three new English constituencies, with a total of six seats, were enfranchised between the restoration of King Charles II in 1660 and the Reform Act 1832. As many of the constituencies were rotten boroughs, which had either decayed into insignificance centuries ago or had never been important settlements, whereas some major towns only participated in elections as part of the historical county they were situated in, the state of representation was very imperfect. By the Glorious Revolution of 1688 there were 513 MPs, until the Act of Union 1707 added 45 MPs for Scotland. (A total of 48 Scottish constituencies were able to return members, but six small counties were arranged in an alternating scheme whereby only three would return a member at each election, giving a total of 45 MPs). These 558 were again increased to 658 by the Act of Union 1800, with the addition of MPs for Ireland.

Over the next 85 years the number of seats varied only slightly, as constituencies were disenfranchised for corruption and the seats were re-allocated some time later (see the lists below for details). The major redistributions of constituencies following the Reform Act 1832 and Reform Act 1867 both created a new House (elected in 1832 and 1868 respectively) with exactly 658 seats. The number of MPs had dropped to 648 by the dissolution before the General Election of 1885.

With the Redistribution of Seats Act 1885, introduced in the wake of the Reform Act of 1884, the size of the House was increased to 670 and remained unchanged until the Representation of the People Act at the end of the First World War.

The period between 1918 and 1922 saw the most MPs in the history of Parliament with 707 seats.

From 1922 the number of seats has fluctuated between 615 and 659. Unlike the position in many countries, such as the United States and Australia, seats are not allocated to different parts of the United Kingdom by a strict mathematical formula. The total number of seats result from the decisions of the four national Boundary Commissions, each applying the rules from time to time provided for by Parliament.

Up to the fifth general review of parliamentary boundaries, the usual effect of the interaction of the rules applied by the four national boundary commissions was to over-represent the non-English parts of the United Kingdom compared to England. The number of seats in each redistribution also tended to rise (although Northern Ireland was under represented between 1922 and 1983 as for most of that time it had a devolved government and from the 2005 redistribution Scotland used the same quota of average number of electors per constituency as England as it now has devolved institutions).

The Parliamentary Voting System and Constituencies Act 2011, amended the rules. For the first time the total number of members of parliament was to be fixed (at 600) and a mathematical formula was prescribed for apportioning seats between the four parts of the United Kingdom. As a result of the new legislation, the sixth general review of parliamentary boundaries commenced. The four national boundary commissions agreed on the apportionment of seats. They had a statutory duty to produce a final report on the review by 1 October 2018, but it was not submitted for approval and never implemented at all in 2019, with Parliament and the commissions keeping the 650 seats and the boundaries as drawn before 2010. For the next election, scheduled for 2024, the newly redrawn constituency boundaries and recommendations, whose process began in January 2021, are expected to be reported no later than June 2023.

Number of MPs since 1654 
The numbering of Parliaments in the table below related to the Protectorate Parliaments (1654–59), the Parliaments of Great Britain (1707–1800) and the Parliaments of the United Kingdom (from 1801).

Notes
[a] Change came into effect during a Parliament.

List of constituencies disenfranchised for corruption and re-allocated seats 1821–85 
The normal number of members of parliament in this period was 658. Changes took effect on the dissolution of the previous Parliament, unless otherwise indicated.

Notes
[a] This change took effect during the Parliament.
[b] This change took effect at the same time as the redistribution provided for by the Reform Act 1867, so the total membership of the 20th Parliament remained unchanged from the 658 at the dissolution of the 19th Parliament.
[c] This change took effect during the Parliament. The Macclesfield borough constituency which was disenfranchised on 25 June 1885, should not be confused with the Macclesfield county constituency which was created under the redistribution that took effect at the 1885 United Kingdom general election and held its first election in November or December 1885.

Number of MPs by country
Under the Commonwealth of England, Scotland and Ireland, the Protectorate regime was established by the Instrument of Government which included a redistribution of parliamentary seats in England and Wales. It also authorised the Lord Protector and Council of State to provide for the parliamentary representation of Scotland and Ireland. This arrangement only lasted for a few years and the three components of the Commonwealth reverted to having individual parliaments.

The total number of MPs representing constituencies in different parts of the United Kingdom has been varied by Act of Parliament several times since the Acts of Union 1707. In the tables below the occasions on which the number has been changed, and the number of MPs following the change is given in each case. The dates given are those when the change took effect. More details of minor changes in the 1821–85 period are set out in the section above.

Monmouthshire is treated as part of Wales throughout this section, although it was sometimes considered to be an English county before the twentieth century. The number of members of parliament representing the county (including borough constituencies within it) was (1654–1885) three, (1885–1918) four and (1918–83) six.

Notes:
 [a] Third Protectorate Parliament.
 [b] Rump Parliament/Long Parliament restored.
 [c] Changes in June 1885.
 [d] Changes at the 1885 United Kingdom general election, in November–December 1885.

A list of the number of MPs from Scotland, as provided for in the year of the legislation specified (but not necessarily the year when the redistribution took effect).
 1654: 30
 1659: 0
 1707: 45
 1832: 53
 1867: 60
 1885: 72
 1918: 74
 1948: 71
 1983: 72
 2003: 59
 Next: 57

In 2003, following the creation of the Scottish Parliament, the Boundary Commission for Scotland met to recommend a decrease in the number of Scottish MPs. This change came into effect following the May 2005 general election.

Recent boundary changes

2010
See Boundary changes for the 2010 United Kingdom general election.

2005

The House of Commons was reduced from 659 to 646, following a boundary review in Scotland that reduced the number of Scottish seats by 13.

1997
The House of Commons was increased from 651 to 659 following a major boundary review.

1992
The House of Commons was increased from 650 to 651, by splitting Milton Keynes into two constituencies after a rare interim boundary review due to the growing size of the town. 
All other seats remained unchanged.

1983
The House of Commons was increased from 635 to 650.

Wales gained 2 seats. Scotland gained 1 seat. Northern Ireland gained 5 seats.

Only 66 constituencies remained unchanged, in the greatest boundary re-organisation since the Great Reform Act.

1955
The House of Commons was increased from 625 to 630 seats.

The five net additional seats were all in England. Eleven new constituencies were created, while six were abolished. Of the new constituencies two were in Essex, with one in each of Middlesex, Surrey, Kent, East Sussex, Hertfordshire, Cheshire, Hampshire, Staffordshire and Warwickshire.

London, Reading, Leeds, Sheffield, Blackburn and Manchester each lost a seat.

In total, 152 constituencies underwent major alterations, with 30 more having minor changes. 324 seats remained unchanged. The average constituency electorate was 55,670.

1950
The House of Commons was reduced from 640 to 625 seats.

The 12 University seats were abolished.

The 12 double-member seats were abolished, being split into separate constituencies. The Cities of London and Westminster, previously having two seats each, were merged into one seat.

Wales gained a seat.

London lost 19 seats, Liverpool 2, Manchester 1, while Edinburgh gained 2 seats, and Bristol, Coventry, Leeds, and Leicester gained 1 each.

Boundary changes were extensive, with only 80 seats remaining unchanged.

References

External links
 Majority Rule and its Problems, Oxford University Press
 British Electoral Facts 1832–1987, compiled and edited by F.W.S. Craig (Parliamentary Research Services, 5th edition, 1989)
 Relative merits of a large vs small parliament

See also 

 Number of Parliamentarians in the Fifth French Republic

House of Commons of the United Kingdom
Members of the Parliament of the United Kingdom
Numbering in politics